Coolham is a small village in the civil parish of Shipley and the Horsham District of West Sussex, England. It is located at the crossroads of the A272 and B2139 roads 2.8 miles (4.6 km) southeast of Billingshurst.

At the crossroads is an old timber-framed inn, the Selsey Arms, formerly the Duke's Head, and before that The King of Prussia.

During the Second World War there was an Advanced Landing Ground nearby called RAF Coolham, used to support the D-Day landings.  This was only in use for about eighteen months, and had almost no permanent buildings. The airmen lived under canvas. Both Polish and British airmen were stationed there, and there is a monument outside the Selsey Arms that lists the names of those who died. The land has long since been reclaimed for agricultural purposes, but there is still a footpath around the field, with trees planted at intervals to commemorate the dead airmen.  Each tree has a name plaque attached.

There was once a prominent Quaker community in Coolham, and the "Blue Idol" meeting house, a timber-framed building, still exists. William Penn, who earlier had founded Pennsylvania in America, was closely involved in its establishment, and is believed to have worshipped there. The local junior school was founded as the Coolham British School (later Coolham Primary School) in 1889 by the Quakers. In the mid-twentieth century it moved to its present site, where it is known as the William Penn Primary School.

Coolham is in the ancient parish of Shipley, which adjoins the A24, near the ruin of Knepp Castle. The castle dates back to medieval times, and was used as a hunting lodge for King John. The site of the parish church of St Mary the Virgin, Shipley, dates back to the Knights Templar, and close by is Shipley Windmill, which was once owned by the Sussex writer Hilaire Belloc during the first half of the twentieth century. The windmill was featured as the home of Jonathan Creek in a TV series that ran on UK television from the late 1990s.

References

External links

Villages in West Sussex
Horsham District